TH Plantations Berhad  (THP) is a Malaysian palm oil company. It was established in 1972.
It has major activity in Indonesia. Its chairman is Yusof Basiran.
There was fire on its land in 2013.
It is owned at 73.83% by the government-run Tabung Haji (2016).
A notable director is Dato' Noordin bin Md Noor, who has long-standing activity in politics.

In 2007, most of its 200,000 ha of its allocated plantation land in Riau was on peat soil.

References

External links

1972 establishments in Malaysia
Companies listed on Bursa Malaysia
Government-owned companies of Malaysia
Malaysian companies established in 1972
Renewable resource companies established in 1972
Tabung Haji
Palm oil companies of Malaysia
Palm oil companies of Indonesia
Agriculture companies established in 1972